Gunga is a village in the Bhopal district of Madhya Pradesh, India located in the Berasia tehsil.

Demographics 

According to the 2011 census of India, Gunga has 762 households. The effective literacy rate (i.e. the literacy rate of population excluding children aged 6 and below) is 66.18%.

References 

Villages in Berasia tehsil